The Harichavank (transliterated as Harijavank or Harichavank) is 7th century Armenian monastery located near the village of Harich (Armenian: Հառիճ) in the Shirak Province of Armenia. The village is 3 km southeast of the town of Artik.

History
Harichavank known as one of the most famous monastic centers in Armenia and it was especially renowned for its school and scriptorium. Archaeological excavations of 1966 indicate that Harich was in existence during the 2nd century BC, and was one of the more well known fortress towns in Armenia.

The oldest part of this Armenian monastery is the Church of St. Gregory the Enlightener (Սբ. Գրիգոր Լուսավորիչ); it is a domed structure that is usually placed in the category of so-called "Mastara-style" churches (named after the fifth century church of St. Hovhannes in the village of Mastara, in the southern part of Shirak). The founding date of the monastery is unknown, but probably it was built no later than the 7th century, when St. Gregory was erected.

The Cathedral of the Holy Mother of God (Սբ. Աստվածածին) that dominates the monastic complex was built by the orders of Zakare Zakarian, Amirspasalar (commander-in-chief) and Prince who ruled Eastern Armenia in the 13th century together with his brother Ivane Zakarian.  Prince Zakare started the Cathedral after he bought Harich from a family representing the Pahlavuni dynasty.

The Cathedral is a cruciform church with two-story sacristies in each of the four extensions of the building. The tall 20-hedral drum of the cupola is of original style. Initially tent-roofed, it acquired triple columns on its facets and large rosettes in the piers which, together with platbands, form an unusual decorative girder around the middle of the drum height. Later, the cupola drum of the Gandzasar Monastery (1216-1238) was decorated in the same way.

The eastern facade of the Cathedral features a relief carving depicting the Zakarian brothers holding a model of the Cathedral in their hands. This theme can be found in many other Armenian churches of the time e.g. on the Memorial Cathedral of the Dadivank Monastery in Nagorno Karabakh, as well as on main churches of the Sanahin and Haghartsin monasteries in Armenia.  This relief was covered in 1895 with a marble plaque featuring Madonna; when the plaque was removed, the original carving showed beneath.

Haritchavank’s Cathedral belongs to the category of "Gandzasar-style" ecclesiastical edifices that were built approximately at the same time in different parts of Armenia, and were endowed with similar compositional and decorative characteristics (another example—Cathedral of the Hovhannavank Monastery). Those include umbrella-shaped dome, cruciform floor plan, narthex (often with stalactite-ornamented ceiling), and high-relief of a large cross on one of church’s walls.

The privileges granted by the princes to the monastery contributed towards its becoming a large cultural and enlightenment center of medieval Armenia. At the end of the 12th and the beginning of the 13th century, two monumental  (narthexes) were built of big stones, some measuring 3.5 meters.  The larger narthex is adjacent to the western facade of the cathedral and is linked to the northern apse of the Church of St. Gregory. It is a rectangular building supported by four pillars, with a stalactite carving in the central part of the ceiling.

Over 800 years the monastery was repeatedly reconstructed. Damages inflicted on it were repaired and small annexes and chapels were added to it at various times. The largest of these dates back to the second half of the 19th century, when Harich was made the summer audience of the Katholikos of Echmiadzin in 1850. The monastery grounds expanded northwards and were encircled with walls and towers. New one- and two-storey structures were erected: Katholikos’ offices, a refectory with a kitchen and a bakery, a school, a hostel for monks and disciples, an inn, stores and cattlesheds. Greenery was planted in the yards.

South of the monastery, on a steep cliff, stands the Hermitage Chapel.  In the cemetery there are ruins of a small single-nave basilica of the fifth century with annexes in the sides of the altar apse and interesting tombstones with ornamented slabs dating from the 5th-6th centuries (now at Armenia’s State History Museum in Yerevan).

Gallery

References

Bibliography 
 Armenia: 1700 years of Christian Architecture. Moughni Publishers, Yerevan, 2001
 Tom Masters and Richard Plunkett. Georgia, Armenia & Azerbaijan, Lonely Planet Publications; 2 edition (July 2004)
 Nicholas Holding. Armenia with Nagorno Karabagh, Bradt Travel Guides; Second edition (October, 2006)

External links 

 Armeniapedia.org: Harichavank Monastery
 Armenica.org: Haritchavank Monastery
 About Harichavank Monastery

Christian monasteries in Armenia
Tourist attractions in Shirak Province
Christian monasteries established in the 7th century
Oriental Orthodox congregations established in the 7th century
Buildings and structures in Shirak Province
7th-century churches in Armenia
13th-century churches in Armenia